
Santa Comba may refer to:

People
Columba of Sens
Columba of Spain
Columba of Cornwall

Places

Portugal
Santa Comba Dão, a city and municipality
Santa Comba (Ponte de Lima), a parish in the district of Ponte de Lima
Santa Comba (Seia), a parish in the district of Seia 
Santa Comba (Vila Nova de Foz Côa), a parish in the district of Vila Nova de Foz Côa
Santa Comba de Rossas, a parish in the district of Bragança

Spain
Santa Comba, Galicia, a municipality in A Coruña province, Galicia